Hadiqat Al Akhbar (Arabic: حديقة الاخبار; The News Garden) was an Arabic newspaper which was published in Beirut in the period 1858–1911 with a two-year interruption. Its subtitle was Ṣaḥīfat Sūriyah wa-Lubnān (Arabic: Newspaper of Syria and Lebanon). The paper was the first private daily in Beirut, the first Arabic newspaper which had a regular literary section and the first weekly Arabic newspaper in the region.

History and profile
Hadiqat Al Akhbar was launched by Khalil Al Khuri, a Syrian, in Beirut. The first issue appeared on 29 June 1858. Michel Médawar who was a Greek Catholic merchant working at the French Consulate in Beirut as an interpreter financed the paper. Its publisher was Al Matbaa Al Suriyya which was owned by Al Khuri. He also edited the paper which began to be published both in Arabic and French from 1870. The French edition was entitled Hadiqat Al Akhbar. Journal de Syrie et Liban. 

Hadiqat Al Akhbar was made a semi-official publication of the Ottoman Empire in 1860 upon the request of Fuad Pasha, Ottoman foreign minister, in the aftermath of the civil conflict in Mount Lebanon and Damascus. Its semi-official status continued until the official  Ottoman publication Suriya was launched. Hadiqat Al Akhbar also functioned in this status between 1869 and 1870 during the governorship of Franco Pasha in Lebanon. The paper was also supported by the Egyptian Khedive Ismail Pasha, possibly after the Ottoman support ended. 

The contributors of the paper and Al Khuri were members of the Médawar Literary Circle. Selim Nauphal was the editor who translated and serialized the French novels in the paper. Antonius Ameuney was the contributor of the paper based in London. 

During its lifetime the frequency of Hadiqat Al Akhbar was changed from daily to weekly and then to biweekly. It featured local and international news, reports on mercantile activity and also literary works. Soon after its start the paper became one of the leading publications in Beirut. Hadiqat Al Akhbar was also distributed to other cities, including Damascus, Aleppo, Baghdad, Alexandria, Cairo, Istanbul, Paris, London and Leipzig. The number of subscribers was nearly 400 within the three months after its start. It gradually increased over time.

In 1907 Hadiqat Al Akhbar temporarily ceased publication. Its publication was restarted in April 1909, but the paper was permanently closed down on 10 April 1911.

References

External links

1858 establishments in the Ottoman Empire
1911 disestablishments in the Ottoman Empire
Arabic-language newspapers
Bilingual newspapers
Biweekly newspapers
Daily newspapers published in Lebanon
Defunct newspapers published in Lebanon
Defunct weekly newspapers
French-language newspapers published in Lebanon
Newspapers established in 1858
Newspapers published in Beirut
Publications disestablished in 1911
Weekly newspapers published in Lebanon